Kolyvanskoye is a rural locality (a selo) and the administrative center of Kolyvansky Selsoviet, Pavlovsky District, Altai Krai, Russia. The population was 1,449 as of 2013. There are 9 streets.

Geography 
Kolyvanskoye is located 47 km south of Pavlovsk (the district's administrative centre) by road. Arbuzovka is the nearest rural locality.

References 

Rural localities in Pavlovsky District, Altai Krai